Jean-Antoine-Joseph de Bry, also spelled Debry (25 November 1760 – 6 January 1834), was a French politician of the French Revolution. He served as President of the National Convention (21 March 1793 – 4 April 1793), and is famous for the slogan La patrie est en danger (The Fatherland is in danger) he proposed.

Early life
Debry was born on 25 November 1760 in Vervins, in the province of Picardy. He became a lawyer at the Parliament of Paris in January 1784, and was appointed administrator of the royal jurisdictions in Vervins in March 1786. In the following years, Debry published multiple writings supporting the ideas of the Enlightenment.

Revolution
With the Revolution he was appointed administrator of the department of Aisne in June 1790. He was elected in September 1791 as deputy of the Legislative Assembly for Aisne. Debry was known as an ardent revolutionary, and in January 1792 successfully proposed a decree that altered the line of succession of the then constitutional French monarchy, by making Louis Stanislas (who eventually reigned as Louis XVIII on the Restoration) ineligible to the French throne due to his emigration from France.

Debry was again elected in September 1792, as a representative of Aisne in the new National Convention. In the following year he voted for the death sentence of King Louis XVI, defended more severe punishments against emigrés, and proposed the transport of Rousseau's remains to the Panthéon in Paris, which was achieved in October 1794. Debry protested against the arrest of the Girondins following the 31 May insurrection, but then kept a low profile until the fall of Robespierre and the end of the Reign of Terror.

He served in the Council of Five Hundred for the entire duration of the Directory regime and as its president between December 1796 and January 1797, seating with the Thermidorians as a dedicated supporter of the Republic.

Diplomatic mission and assassination attempt

In 1798, Debry was chosen as one of the three delegates of the French Republic sent to the Congress of Rastatt, with the intention of negotiating a peace treaty with the Holy Roman Empire. When leaving Rastatt on 28 April 1799, the three were assaulted by a group of hussars. The other French envoys, Roberjot and Bonnier, were killed on the spot, while Debry received thirteen sabre wounds but survived, having managed to escape and hurriedly seek asylum with a Prussian government official.

Using an arm sling, Debry was acclaimed on his return to the Council of Five Hundred on 20 May 1799, and on the same day was elected for another term as its president.

Consulat, Empire and later life
A supporter of Napoleon Bonaparte in his coup of 18 Brumaire, Debry became a member of the Tribunat in December 1799 following its creation by the Constitution of the Year VIII. From then on he held local administration offices, being appointed in April 1801 préfet of the department of Doubs, remaining in office until the First Bourbon Restoration in 1814. He was awarded the Legion of Honour in 1803, and was made Knight (1808) and later Baron of the Empire (1809).

Despite a friendly approach towards the restored Bourbons, Debry accepted Napoleon's appointment to the prefecture of Bas-Rhin during the Hundred Days, on 22 March 1815. Following the emperor's second abdication he was dismissed from office, and in January 1816 forced to leave the country by a law that exiled the regicides of Louis XVI. He retired to Mons, in the United Kingdom of the Netherlands. Debry was only allowed to return with the definitive fall of the Bourbons in 1830, and as a former prefect was granted a pension by the new government of Louis Philippe of France. He died in Paris on 6 January 1834.

Works
Essai sur l'éducation nationale (1790)
Eloge de Mirabeau (1790)
Opinion sur la Constituition de 1793
Catéchisme des élections (1797)

References

External links 
 Jean-Louis Laneuville's Portrait of Jean de Bry, ca 1793. Eskenazi Museum of Art, Indiana University, 77.54.1

1760 births
1834 deaths
People from Aisne
18th-century French lawyers
Members of the Legislative Assembly (France)
Presidents of the National Convention
Regicides of Louis XVI
People on the Committee of Public Safety
Members of the Council of Five Hundred
Exiled French politicians
Recipients of the Legion of Honour